The 1994 European Parliament election in Luxembourg was the election of MEP representing Luxembourg constituency for the 1994–1999 term of the European Parliament.  It was part of the wider 1994 European election. It was held on 12 June 1994.

Candidates

Results

Elected members
Christian Social People's Party
Members of the European People's Party
 Astrid Lulling
 Viviane Reding
Democratic Party
Members of the European Liberal Democrat and Reform Party
 Charles Goerens
The Greens
Members of the European Federation of Green Parties
 Jup Weber
Luxembourg Socialist Workers' Party
Members of the Party of European Socialists
 Ben Fayot
 Marcel Schlechter

References

Luxembourg
European Parliament elections in Luxembourg
1994 in Luxembourg